Z Nation is an American horror-comedy-drama/post-apocalyptic television series that airs on Syfy, created by Karl Schaefer and Craig Engler, and produced by The Asylum. The first season of 13 episodes premiered on September 12, 2014. 

On December 15, 2017, Syfy renewed the series for a fifth season, which premiered on October 5, 2018. On December 22, 2018, Syfy canceled the series after five seasons. The 68th and ultimate episode aired on December 28, 2018, concluding the five-season series.

Series overview

Episodes

Season 1 (2014)

Season 2 (2015)

Season 3 (2016)

Season 4 (2017)

Season 5 (2018)

Ratings

References

External links
 
 

Lists of American horror-supernatural television series episodes
Lists of American comedy-drama television series episodes